Fakhrozzaman Jabbar Vaziri (1912 – 2009) was an Iranian actress. She was one of the pioneering actresses of Iranian cinema and mostly famous for playing in three Iranina films directed by Abdolhossein Sepanta. These three film are Shirin and Farhad, The Black Eyes and Leili and Majnun.

References 

1912 births
2009 deaths
Iranian actresses